The Calidus B-250 is a tandem-seat, turboprop, light attack aircraft with counter-insurgency capability. Its structure is constructed entirely of carbon fiber, thus making it much lighter than its competitors. It has 7 hard points for placing weapons as well as EO/IR. It has Pro Line Fusion II avionics systems supplied by the American company Rockwell Collins.

Design and development
The B-250 is a low-wing cantilever monoplane with a retractable tricycle landing gear. It has an enclosed cockpit with two Martin-Baker ejection seats in tandem. It has a single Pratt & Whitney Canada PT-6A-68 turboprop in tractor configuration. It was designed and developed in Brazil by Novaer, with mass production to be undertaken by Calidus in the United Arab Emirates. The chief designer for the project was Joseph Kovács who created the Embraer Tucano. 

In 2019, 24 aircraft were ordered by the United Arab Emirates Air Force at the 2019 Dubai Airshow.

Operators

 United Arab Emirates Air Force

Specifications

See also
 Calidus B-350
Embraer EMB 314 Super Tucano
 Novaer T-Xc
 Novaer U-Xc Stardream

References

External links

 Calidus B-250 webpage
 Novaer B-250 webpage

Single-engined turboprop aircraft
Aircraft first flown in 2017
Emirati military aircraft
Single-engined tractor aircraft
Low-wing aircraft